Bebaakee (Madness) is a Hindi-language drama web series directed by Muzammil Desai and produced by Ekta Kapoor and Shobha Kapoor under their banner Balaji Telefilms. It stars Kushal Tandon, Karan Jotwani along with debutant Shiv Jyoti Rajput in lead roles. The first eight episodes was streamed on ZEE5 and ALTBalaji on 30 August 2020 while the ninth and tenth streamed on 2 September 2020. The next five episodes were released on 12 October 2020 while the remaining sixteen episode of the first season were released on 11 December 2020. The series will receive a second season but the release date hasn't been officially announced.

The show captures the unbreakable bonds of love, friendship, brotherhood and even hate. Through the characters and the family, we discover that the strongest bonds can be the most fragile, and the people closest to us can cause the most damage.

Summary 
Set in Shimla, Sufiyaan Abdullah, Kainaat Sahani and Imtiaz Alqaazi, are three very different yet equally strong and stubborn personalities. While Kainaat is a beautiful journalist from a simple yet loving family with her priorities and ambitions in place, Sufiyaan is a womaniser from a rich but complicated setup which makes him untrusting of love and girls as he witnessed his father cheat on his mother with his aunt and now cheating on his second wife as well. Rounding off the trio is Sufiyaan’s best friend Imtiaz Alqaazi, a charming, caring and intelligent man who finds an instant kinship with Kainaat. Adil and Farhad, Sufiyan and Imitiaz’s fathers have been best friends all their lives and are like family, and so are their children. They own a huge media company, United India together and share the same property.

All three lives are changed when the trio fall into a love triangle that questions theirs as well as their family's love and friendship and togetherness. The series focuses on Sufiyaan’s ‘bebaak pyaar‘ (obsession, madness, insanity) and how he is willing to get what he wants despite the consequences.

Cast

Main 
 Kushal Tandon as Sufiyaan Abdullah; Adil and Rashida’s son; Benazir’s step-son; Rahil’s older half-brother; Imitiaz’s best friend/brother-figure and Kainaat’s obsessed lover
 Karan Jotwani as Imtiaz Alqaazi; Farhad and Dana’s eldest son; Hamid and Farah’s older brother; Sufiyaan’s best friend/brother figure and Kainaat’s husband
 Shiv Jyoti Rajput as Kainaat Alqaazi née Sahani; Indrapreet and Tahira’s eldest daughter; Harleen, Falak and Dilsher’s older sister; Sufiyaan’s former lover and Imtiaz’s wife

Recurring 
 Sameer Malhotra as Adil Abdullah; Sufiyaan and Rahil’s father; Farhad’s best friend; Rashida’s former husband and Benazir’s husband
 Ananya Khare as Benazir Abdullah; Adil's second wife; Rashida’s sister; Rahil's mother and Sufiyaan’s step-mother/aunt
 Mohit Chauhan as Farhad Alqaazi; Imtiaz, Hamid and Farah’s father; Adil’s best friend and Dana’s husband
 Suchitra Pillai as Dana Alqaazi; Imtiaz, Hamid and Farah’s mother; Farhad’s wife
 Indraneel Bhattacharya as Indrapreet Sahani; Kainaat, Harleen, Falak and Dilsher’s father; Tahira’s husband; and a college professor
 Pubali Sanyal as Tahira Sahani; Kainaat, Harleen, Falak and Dilsher’s mother; Indrapreet’s wife
 Saloni Vora as Falak Sahani; Indrapeet and Tahira’s youngest daughter; Kainaat, Harleen and Dilsher’s sister
 Aditi Vats as Harleen Sahani; Indrapeet and Tahira’s middle daughter; Kainaat, Falak and Dilsher’s sister
 Krutika Desai Khan as Rashida Abdullah; Sufiyaan's mother; Adil’s first wife and Benazir’s elder sister
 Juhaina Ahsan as Farah Alqaazi; Dana and Farhad’s daughter; Imtiaz and Hamid’s sister
 Pratik Sehajpal as Rahil Abdullah; Benazir and Adil’s son; Sufiyaan’s younger half-brother; Harleen and Falak’s love interest
 Ishaan Dhawan as Hamid Alqaazi; Dana and Farhad's youngest son; Imtiaz and Farah’s brother; Dilsher’s lover
 Mahir Pandhi as Dilsher Sahani; Indrapreet and Tahira’s son; Kainaat, Harleen and Falak’s younger brother; Hamid’s lover
 Nasir Khan as Joey Thomas; assistant of United India
 Massheuddin Qureshi as Wasim; Alqaazi-Abdullah’s chief servant whom Sufiyaan is close to 
 Palak Purswani as Laila; one of Sufiyaan’s many lovers
 Rini Das as Serena; one of Sufiyaan’s many lovers and therapist
 Vinitha Menon as Ruhi; employee of United India
 Krish Chugh as child Sufiyaan
 Gaurav Venkatesh as Andy; Alqaazi/Abdullah’s family servant
 Rekha Desai as Dilshaad; Dana’s personal maidservant
 Prakhar Toshniwal as Namik; Rahil and Hamid’s best friend.
 Ashwin Dadlani as Vicky; Rahil and Hamid’s best friend
 Paras Cchadha as Rohan; Rahil and Hamid’s best friend
 Aarti Khetarpal as Nazia; Imtiaz’s ex-girlfriend who has a fling with Sufiyaan

Episodes

Season 1

Soundtrack 

The music of the film was composed by various composers, and the lyrics were written by Rashmi Virag. The background music was composed by Chandan Saxena. Vocals were arranged by Shriya Chopra.

Marketing and release

Promotion 
The official teaser of the webseries was launched by ALTBalaji on YouTube on 17 July 2020, while the trailer was launched on 19 August 2020 by ALTBalaji on YouTube.

Release 
Bebaakee premiered through ZEE5 and Alt Balaji on 30 August 2020.

See also 
 ALTBalaji original programming

References

External links 
 Bebaakee on ALTBalaji
 
 Bebaakee on ZEE5
 Upcoming to Netflix

2020 web series debuts
Indian drama web series
ALTBalaji original programming
ZEE5 original programming